The name Ramil has been used in the Philippines by PAGASA in the Western Pacific. It was originally named as Roleta in 2001.

 Typhoon Lupit (2009) (T0920, 22W, Ramil) – powerful Category 5 super typhoon that formed northwest of Kwajalein, and recurved off Luzon, becoming extratropical northeast of Japan.
 Typhoon Danas (2013) (T1324, 23W, Ramil) – Category 4 typhoon, which struck the Ryukyu Islands and Japan.
 Typhoon Damrey (2017) (T1723, 28W, Ramil)

Pacific typhoon set index articles